John Allen McDorman IV (born July 8, 1986) is an American actor best known for the film American Sniper and starring on television shows such as CBS' "Limitless" and the Disney+ historical drama "The Right Stuff" as Alan Shepard . He is also well known for his roles on the ABC Family comedy-drama Greek (2007–2011), the fourth season of the Showtime comedy-drama Shameless (2014), the revival of the CBS sitcom Murphy Brown (2018), and FX's "What We Do In The Shadows." Most recently he was seen on HULU's award winning "Dopesick." He will next be seen starring in Peacock's upcoming A.I. mind-bending drama "Mrs. Davis" opposite Betty Gilpin.

Early life
McDorman was born in Dallas, Texas, the son of Deborah Gale (née Stallings) and John Allen McDorman III. He has a younger sister, Morgan, and an older half-sister, Amanda. McDorman studied acting at the Dallas Young Actors Studio and Nancy Chartier's Film and Acting Studio. He attended Richardson High School, Westwood Junior High and Northwood Hills Elementary in Texas.

Career
McDorman starred in the Fox sitcom Quintuplets from 2004 to 2005, and later guest-starred on House, CSI: Miami and Cold Case. He made his film debut in the 2005 thriller Echoes of Innocence, and later has appeared in Aquamarine, Bring It On: All or Nothing and Live Free or Die Hard. From 2007 to 2011, McDorman starred as Evan Chambers in the ABC Family teen drama series Greek. He also played the lead role in the 2011 Lifetime movie The Craigslist Killer.

In 2012, McDorman played the male lead role opposite Laura Prepon in the short-lived NBC sitcom Are You There, Chelsea?. He later joined the cast of Showtime comedy-drama, Shameless as Mike Pratt. He starred in the film See You in Valhalla opposite Sarah Hyland, and in 2014 co-starred in Clint Eastwood's film American Sniper. Also in 2014, McDorman was cast in the male lead role opposite Lio Tipton in the ABC romantic comedy series, Manhattan Love Story.  In 2015, he starred in CBS's Limitless as Brian Finch, a young man who uses a mysterious drug called "NZT" to enhance his intelligence to help the FBI solve cases. The TV series continued the story of the motion picture of the same name. McDorman went on to play Mr. Bruno in the Academy Award nominated film Lady Bird in 2017. Additionally he was seen as Nelson Gardner on the highly acclaimed episode of HBO's "Watchmen" entitled 'The Extraordinary Being.' His upcoming series "Mrs. Davis" reunites him with "Watchmen" creator Damon Lindelof.

Filmography

Film

Television

References

External links

1986 births
Living people
American male child actors
American male film actors
American male television actors
Male actors from Dallas
21st-century American male actors